The Queen's Club Championships is an annual tournament for male tennis players, held on grass courts at the Queen's Club in West Kensington, London. The event is part of the ATP Tour 500 series on the Association of Tennis Professionals (ATP) Tour. It is currently advertised as the "cinch Championships" after its title sponsor.

Queen's is one of the oldest tennis tournaments in the world, and serves as a warm-up for Wimbledon. Andy Murray has won a record five titles between 2009 and 2016.

History

Originally known as the London Athletic Club Tournament or officially London Athletic Club Open Tournament established in 1881 at Stamford Bridge, Fulham. In 1885 the tournament was given the title of the Championship of London then later London Championships, and it was held on outdoor grass courts. In 1890, the tournament moved to its current location, the Queen's Club and consisted of a men's and women's singles event. In 1903 a men's doubles event was added followed in 1905 by the mixed doubles competition. In 1915 the addition of a women's doubles event completed the programme. The two World Wars interrupted the tournament from 1913 to 1918 and 1940–1946. Between 1970 and 1989 the Championships were part of the Grand Prix tennis circuit. The women's tournament was discontinued after the 1973 edition and from 1974 until 1976 no men's tournament was held. and by this point the tournament was known as the London Grass Court Championships. From 1977 its been called the Queens Club Championships. The event is currently an ATP Tour 500 series tournament on the Association of Tennis Professionals (ATP) Tour and was upgraded from an ATP World Tour 250 series in 2015. The tournament was voted ATP Tournament of the Year for four years consecutively between 2013 and 2014 when it was an ATP 250 tournament and between 2015 and 2016 when it was an ATP 500 tournament. It then won it again in 2018 and 2019.

During the 2004 singles tournament, Andy Roddick set the then world record for the fastest serve, recorded at 153 mph (246.2 km/h) during a straight-set victory over Thailand's Paradorn Srichaphan in the quarter-finals.

In 2016, Andy Murray won the singles title for a record fifth time. Seven men have won four singles titles; Major Ritchie, Anthony Wilding, Roy Emerson, John McEnroe, Boris Becker, Lleyton Hewitt and Andy Roddick.

Schedule

The Queen's Club Championships are held every year in June. The equivalent warm-up event for women is the Eastbourne International, although this is held one week later.

Up to 2014, the break between the French Open and Wimbledon was just two weeks, and the Queen's Club Championships started the day after the French Open's men's final. This changed when Wimbledon moved back a week to expand the length of the grass court season.

Grass courts are the least common playing surface for top-level events on the ATP World Tour. The 2009 schedule included only four grass court tournaments in the run-up to Wimbledon. They were the Queen's Club Championships, Gerry Weber Open, Eastbourne International, and the Rosmalen Grass Court Championships. An additional tournament is played on grass in Newport, Rhode Island, USA, in the week immediately after Wimbledon.

Coverage

The BBC has covered the tournament since 1979 and in recent years it has shown the tournament in full after originally only broadcasting the final four days of the event. The BBC has a contract in place until 2024. It broadcasts the event mainly on BBC Two as well as on BBC Radio 5 Live and BBC Sport online. It was shown in High Definition for the first time in 2009.

Since 2018, Amazon Prime has also broadcast from The Queen's Club in the UK.

The ball girls for the Aegon Championships are provided by Nonsuch High School and St Philomena's Catholic High School for Girls, two schools in the London Borough of Sutton.

Sponsorship
From 1979 until 2008, the tournament was sponsored by Stella Artois, and thus called the Stella Artois Championships. In 2009 the tournament was renamed the Aegon Championships following a comprehensive sponsorship deal between Lawn Tennis Association and Aegon, which also led to renaming of Birmingham and Eastbourne grass court events. In 2018, Fever-Tree began sponsoring the tournament. The online car selling website cinch became the title sponsor of the championships in 2021.

Past finals

Men's singles

Women's singles

Fulham

London

Men's doubles

Since 1969:

(Note: Tournament dates back to 1890)

Women's doubles

Junior championship finals

Statistics

Champions by country

Men's singles

Men's doubles

Players and winners
Most titles – Andy Murray (6) (5 singles, 1 doubles)
Most Singles titles – Andy Murray (5).
Most Singles finals – Major Ritchie (8).
Youngest winner – Boris Becker, 17 years 207 days in 1985.
Oldest winner – Major Ritchie, 38 years old in 1909 (Open era oldest winner was Feliciano López at 37 years old in 2019)
Lowest-ranked champion – Feliciano López, ranked 113 in the world in 2019.
Lowest-ranked finalist – Laurence Tieleman, ranked 253 in the world in 1998.
Winners of both events – Pete Sampras in 1995 (doubles with Todd Martin), Mark Philippoussis in 1997 (doubles with Patrick Rafter), and Feliciano López in 2019 (doubles with Andy Murray).
Most prize money received – Andy Murray €1,064,565 + $15,275 (£850,007 at 19/06/16 exchange rates)
22 of the last 25 Wimbledon champions have played at the Queen's Club Championships.
Several players have completed the Queen's/Wimbledon double, winning both events back to back, including Don Budge, Roy Emerson, John McEnroe, Jimmy Connors, Boris Becker, Pete Sampras, Lleyton Hewitt, Rafael Nadal and Andy Murray; only McEnroe, Sampras and Murray have completed this twice.

Attendance
Pre-2017 the Centre Court held 6,479 spectators. From 2017 onwards, capacity increased by over 2,000 to almost 9,000 seats. The highest total attendance for the week was in 2003, when 52,553 people attended the event; The highest attendance for one day was 8,362 on 11 June 2003.

See also
 British Covered Court Championships – indoor tournament played at the Queen's Club between 1895 and 1971

References

Notes

External links

 Official tournament website
 The Queen's Club website
 ATP tournament profile
 LTA tournament profile

 
Grass court tennis tournaments
Tennis tournaments in England
Tennis in London
ATP Tour 250
Recurring sporting events established in 1890
History of the London Borough of Hammersmith and Fulham
Sport in Hammersmith and Fulham
1890 establishments in England